Gregory Baker (born April 16, 1968 in Saint Paul, Minnesota) is an American television and film, actor and musician. He is perhaps best known for his recurring roles as Elliott, a producer on the show Sports Night, Mr. Corelli, Miley Stewart's history teacher on Hannah Montana and his main lead role Burger Pitt on I'm in the Band.

Filmography

Television

Film

References

External links

Greg Baker at TV Guide

Male actors from Saint Paul, Minnesota
American male television actors
American male film actors
1968 births
Living people